Henry Mance may refer to:

 Henry Christopher Mance (1840–1926), British electrical engineer
 Henry Osborne Mance (1875–1966), British Army officer, transportation expert and author